Charles Schoebel (1813–1888) was a 19th-century French ethnologist, palaeographer and linguist.

Works 
 Analogies constitutives de la langue allemande avec le grec et le latin expliquées par le samskrit, 1845
 L'Éternité et la consommation des temps, 1854
 Le Bouddha et le bouddhisme, 1857
 De l'Universalité du déluge, 1858
 Démonstration critique de l'authenticité du Pentateuque sous le triple rapport de la personnalité historique de Moi͏̈se, son auteur, de son unité et de sa vérité, 1858
 Les Stations d'Israël dans le désert : examen des objections faites par les rationnalistes allemands et quelques écrivains français contre le récit de Moyse à propos des campements des Israélites dans le désert, 1859 
 De l'universalité du déluge, 1859 
 De l'Agitation réformiste en Allemagne, 1859 
 Mémoires sur les six jours ou époques de la Genèse, 1859 
 Le Centième Anniversaire de la naissance de Schiller, 1859
 Satan et la chute de l'homme, 1859
 L'Histoire de Balaam, l'authenticité de sa prophétie, 1860
 Mémoire sur le monothéisme primitif attribué par M. E. Renan à la seule race sémitique, 1860
 Examen critique du déchiffrement des Inscriptions cunéiformes assyriennes : [compte rendu critique de l'] expédition scientifique en Mésopotamie par Jules Oppert, 1861
 La Bhagavad-Gita : étude de philosophie indienne, 1861
 La Philologie comparée de l'origine du langage, Paris : Duprat, 1862
 Philosophie de la raison pure, avec un appendice de critique historique par M. Schoebel / Paris : G. Baillière, 1865
 L'Unité organique du Faust de Goethe, Paris : Challamel aîné , 1867
 Démonstration critique de l'authenticité mosai͏̈que du Deutéronome, Paris : E. Thorin, 1868
 Un Manuscrit bas-allemand restitué, annoté et traduit par C. Schoebel, / Paris : Challamel aîné, 1868
 Recherches sur la religion première de la race indo-irânienne, Paris : Maisonneuve, 1868
 Démonstration de l'authenticité mosai͏̈que du Lévitique et des Nombres, Paris : Maisonneuve, 1869
 Étude sur le rituel du respect social dans l'état brahmanique, Paris : Maisonneuve, 1870
 Démonstration de l'authenticité mosaïque de l'Exode, Paris : Maisonneuve, 1871
 La Question d'Alsace au point de vue ethnographique, Paris : Sandoz et Fischbacher, 1872
 Les Slaves du nord de l'Allemagne, Paris : Challamel aîné , 1872 
 Recherches sur la religion première de la race indo-iranienne. Deuxième éd. revue et augmentée, Paris : Maisonneuve et Cie, 1872
 La question d'Alsace au point de vue ethnographique, Paris : Ch. Meyrueis, 1872
 Démonstration de l'authenticité de la Genèse, Paris : Maisonneuve, 1873-1877
 Le Buddhisme : ses origines, le Nirvana, accord de la morale avec le Nirvana, Paris : Maisonneuve, 1874
 Le Moïse historique, Paris : Maisonneuve, 1875
 Le Mythe de la femme et du serpent: étude sur les origines d'une évolution psychologique primordiale, Paris : Maisonneuve, 1876
 La Légende du Juif-errant, Paris : Maisonneuve, 1877 
 L'histoire des rois mages, Paris : Maisonneuve et Cie, 1878 
 L'Âme humaine au point de vue de la science ethnographique, suivi d'une note sur Claude Bernard et son principe du criterium expérimental, 2e édition / Paris : 47, avenue Duquesne, 1878? 
 Inde française. L'histoire des origines et du développement des castes de l'Inde, Paris : Challamel aîné , 1884 
 Les Doctrines cosmogoniques et philosophiques de l'Inde, Louvain : impr. de C. Peeters, 1886
 Le Râmâyana au point de vue religieux, philosophique et moral, Paris : E. leroux, 1888
 La Légende des Pandavas, [S. l.] : [s. n.] , [1870] 
 Le Rituel brahmanique du respect social, traduit du sanscrit par Charles Schoebel / Paris : impr. de Vve Bouchard-Huzard, [1874]
 Mémoire sur les origines de l'écriture alphabétique, [S. l. ] : [s. n.] , [1879] 
 Étude sur le verbe Être, Paris, [18??]

External links 
 Charles Schoebel on data.bnf.fr
 Charles Schoebel

 idref.fr
 Internet Archive

Linguists from France
French ethnologists
French palaeographers
1813 births
1888 deaths